is Japanese rock band Bump of Chicken's 22nd single, featured as the ending theme to the film Always Sanchōme no Yūhi '64.

Track list

References

2012 singles
Bump of Chicken songs
Oricon Weekly number-one singles
Billboard Japan Hot 100 number-one singles
2011 songs
Toy's Factory singles
Japanese film songs
Songs written by Motoo Fujiwara